Kendriya Vidyalaya, IISc Bangalore is a CBSE-affiliated secondary school at Bengaluru IISc campus started in 1978 under the chairmanship of Professor Satish Dhawan. The school is one of the schools under the group known as the Kendriya Vidyalayas, which is a system of central government schools under the Ministry of Human Resource Development. Kendriya Vidyalaya IISc is English medium co-ed school and one among 14 Kendriya Vidyalayas in Bangalore.

References

External links

Kendriya Vidyalayas in Bangalore